Earl Francis McEssy (February 12, 1913 – October 14, 1989) was a member of the Wisconsin State Assembly.

Biography
McEssy was born in Fond du Lac, Wisconsin. He graduated from Marquette University. Additionally, he received an honorary doctorate from Marian College. During World War II, he served with the United States Navy.

Political career
McEssy was a member of the Assembly from 1957 to 1988. He was a Republican.

References

Politicians from Fond du Lac, Wisconsin
Military personnel from Wisconsin
United States Navy sailors
United States Navy personnel of World War II
Marquette University alumni
1913 births
1989 deaths
20th-century American politicians
Republican Party members of the Wisconsin State Assembly